Andrew John Walter Page (born 17 September 1965) is a British diplomat.

He was educated at Windlesham House School, Lancing College and Jesus College, Cambridge.  He was Deputy Head of the Russia, South Caucasus and Central Asia Directorship (2004–2008) before being appointed as British Ambassador to Slovenia in 2009. He left Slovenia in December 2013.

References

1965 births
Living people
People educated at Lancing College
Alumni of Jesus College, Cambridge
Ambassadors of the United Kingdom to Slovenia

People educated at Windlesham House School